Travis Vernon Green (born December 20, 1970) is a Canadian ice hockey coach and former professional ice hockey player. He is the former head coach of the Vancouver Canucks of the National Hockey League (NHL). He also previously coached the American Hockey League's Utica Comets, Vancouver's top minor league affiliate. Drafted 23rd overall in 1989, Green played for five different National Hockey League (NHL) teams in his 14-year career.

Playing career
Green started out with the Spokane Chiefs in the Western Hockey League (WHL), playing with them from 1986 to 1989. In the middle of the 1989–90 season, he was traded to the Medicine Hat Tigers, where he completed his junior career. While with the Chiefs, he scored 137 goals and 165 assists for a total of 302 points. He added 15 goals, 24 assists, and 39 points with the Tigers.

Green was drafted 23rd overall by the New York Islanders in the 1989 NHL Entry Draft. Green played 857 career games, scoring 182 goals and 249 assists for 431 points. His best season statistically was the 1995–96 season, when he scored 25 goals and 45 assists for 70 points in only 69 games. On June 30, 2006, the final year of his contract with the Boston Bruins was bought out. On August 10, 2006, he was signed by the Anaheim Ducks, the team he had previously played for from 1998 to 1999. However, he played only seven games in his return to the Ducks, before being claimed on waivers by another former team, the Toronto Maple Leafs, in January 2007.

Green was a member of Team Canada at the 2007 Spengler Cup.

Coaching career

After finishing his playing career, Green was hired by the Portland Winterhawks as an assistant coach and assistant general manager in 2008. Midway through the 2012–13 season, head coach and general manager Mike Johnston was suspended by the WHL for player-benefit violations. Green took over as interim head coach, finishing with a 37–8–0–2 record in the final 47 games. In the playoffs Portland advanced to the final where they defeated the Edmonton Oil Kings in six games to win the Ed Chynoweth Cup as WHL champions and secure a berth in the Memorial Cup tournament. In the tournament Portland lost in the final to the Halifax Mooseheads.

In the 2013 off-season, Green was hired as the head coach of the American Hockey League's (AHL) Utica Comets, the top minor league affiliate of the National Hockey League's (NHL) Vancouver Canucks. In the 2014–15 season, he led them to the Calder Cup finals where they lost in five games to the Manchester Monarchs. On April 26, 2017, he was named head coach of the Vancouver Canucks. On December 5, 2021, Green was fired as the head coach of the Canucks along with general manager Jim Benning after leading the team to an 8-15-2 record.

Personal life
Green and his wife have one daughter and two sons. One of his sons was diagnosed with autism when he was two years old. He was born in Creston, BC, as his father was working for the West Kootenay Power & Light Co. in the nearby village of Crawford Bay at the time.

Career statistics

Regular season and playoffs

International

Head coaching record

NHL

Other leagues

References

External links
 

1970 births
Living people
Anaheim Ducks players
Boston Bruins players
Canadian expatriate ice hockey players in Switzerland
Canadian ice hockey centres
Canadian ice hockey coaches
Capital District Islanders players
EV Zug players
Ice hockey people from British Columbia
Medicine Hat Tigers players
Mighty Ducks of Anaheim players
New York Islanders draft picks
New York Islanders players
Phoenix Coyotes players
Portland Winterhawks coaches
Spokane Chiefs players
Sportspeople from Castlegar, British Columbia
Toronto Maple Leafs players
Vancouver Canucks coaches